Angelo de Consilio or Angelo de Conciliis (died 1429) was a Roman Catholic prelate who served as Bishop of Acerra (1403–1429).

Biography
On 30 July 1403, Angelo de Consilio was appointed Bishop of Acerra by Pope Boniface IX. He served as Bishop of Acerra until his death in 1429.

While bishop, he was the principal co-consecrator of Angelo Marcuzzi, Bishop of Telese o Cerreto Sannita (1413).

See also 
Catholic Church in Italy

References 

Year of birth missing
1429 deaths
15th-century Italian Roman Catholic bishops
Bishops appointed by Pope Boniface IX